Sodiq Olamide Yusuff (born May 19, 1993) is a Nigerian–American mixed martial artist who competes in the Ultimate Fighting Championship (UFC) in the Featherweight division. As of December 13, 2022, he is #12 in the UFC featherweight rankings.

Background 
Being born in Lagos, Nigeria, his father is from Ibadan while his mother was born in Lagos. He grew up in a polygamist community, with his father having four wives, and the four of them lived together as a unit. Yusuff claims he is one of 16 children in the family, with four siblings with his birth mother. When he was nine years old, his mother took him and his younger brother to the United States. His extended family has never visited the United States and is still living in Nigeria, having a hard time getting visas.

Yusuff attributed his fascination in battle during his formative years to anime, which led to his MMA career.

Mixed martial arts career

Early career
At Shogun Fights 14, where he made his MMA debut, he defeated Alvin Mercer by second-round TKO. Yusuff won against his next three opponents, including Chuka Willis and John Ramirez. Then, in round one of CFFC 66, he eliminated Vladim Ogar. At Titan FC 47, he competed against Luis Gomez for the Featherweight Championship and was defeated in the opening frame. At Brave CF 10, Yusuff won his lone fight with Brave Combat Federation by first-round TKO over Ireland's Dylan Tuke.

Dana White's Tuesday Night Contender Series 
Yusuff appeared on Dana White's Contender Series 14 on July 24, 2018, facing Mike Davis. He won the fight via unanimous decision. With this win, Yusuff was awarded a contract by the UFC.

Ultimate Fighting Championship
Yusuff made his UFC debut on  December 2, 2018 at UFC Fight Night: dos Santos vs. Tuivasa against Suman Mokhtarian. He won the fight via technical knockout in round one.

Yusuff's second fight came on March 30, 2019 at Philadelphia, facing Sheymon Moraes, at UFC on ESPN 2. He won the fight via unanimous decision.

Yusuff faced Gabriel Benítez on August 17, 2019 at UFC 241. He won the fight via knockout in round one.

Yusuff faced Andre Fili on January 18, 2020 at UFC 246. He won the fight by unanimous decision. 

Yusuff was expected to face Edson Barboza on October 11, 2020 at UFC Fight Night 179. However, Yusuff pulled out of the fight on September 22 for undisclosed reasons.

Yusuff faced Arnold Allen on April 10, 2021 at UFC on ABC 2. He lost the fight via unanimous decision.

Yusuff faced Alex Caceres on March 12, 2022 at UFC Fight Night 203. Utilizing leg kicks throughout the bout, Yusuff won the bout via unanimous decision.

Yusuff was scheduled to face Giga Chikadze on September 17, 2022 at UFC Fight Night 210.  However, the week before the event, Chikadze withdrew for due to injury and the bout was cancelled.

Sodiq Yusuff faced Don Shainis October 1, 2022, at UFC Fight Night 211. He submitted Shainis via guillotine choke 30 seconds into the bout.

Personal life
Yusuff became a U.S. citizen during the training camp for his fight at UFC 246 against Andre Fili.

Mixed martial arts record

|-
|Win
|align=center|13–2
|Don Shainis
|Submission (guillotine choke)
|UFC Fight Night: Dern vs. Yan
|
|align=center|1
|align=center|0:30
|Las Vegas, Nevada, United States
|
|-
|Win
|align=center|12–2
|Alex Caceres
|Decision (unanimous)
|UFC Fight Night: Santos vs. Ankalaev
|
|align=center|3
|align=center|5:00
|Las Vegas, Nevada, United States
|
|-
|Loss
|align=center|11–2
|Arnold Allen
|Decision (unanimous)
|UFC on ABC: Vettori vs. Holland
|
|align=center|3
|align=center|5:00
|Las Vegas, Nevada, United States
|
|-
|Win
|align=center|11–1
|Andre Fili
|Decision (unanimous)
|UFC 246
|
|align=center|3
|align=center|5:00
|Las Vegas, Nevada, United States
|
|-
| Win
| align=center|10–1
| Gabriel Benítez
| TKO (punches)
| UFC 241
| 
| align=center|1
| align=center|4:14
| Anaheim, California, United States
|
|-
| Win
| align=center|9–1
| Sheymon Moraes
| Decision (unanimous)
| UFC on ESPN: Barboza vs. Gaethje
| 
| align=center|3
| align=center|5:00
| Philadelphia, Pennsylvania, United States
|
|-
| Win
| align=center|8–1
| Suman Mokhtarian
| TKO (punches)
| UFC Fight Night: dos Santos vs. Tuivasa
| 
| align=center|1
| align=center|2:14
| Adelaide, Australia
|
|-
| Win
| align=center|7–1
| Mike Davis
| Decision (unanimous)
| Dana White's Contender Series 14
| 
| align=center|3
| align=center|5:00
| Las Vegas, Nevada, United States
|
|-
| Win
| align=center| 6–1
| Dylan Tuke
| TKO (punches)
| Brave 10
| 
| align=center|1
| align=center|0:46
| Amman, Jordan
|
|-
| Loss
| align=center| 5–1
| Luis Gomez
| KO (punches)
| Titan FC 47
| 
| align=center|1
| align=center|4:12
| Fort Lauderdale, Florida, United States
|
|-
| Win
| align=center| 5–0
| Vadim Ogar
| KO (punch)
| CFFC 66
| 
| align=center|1
| align=center|0:30
| Atlantic City, New Jersey, United States
|
|-
| Win
| align=center| 4–0 
| Chuka Willis
| Decision (unanimous)
| VFC 56
| 
| align=center|3
| align=center|5:00
| Omaha, Nebraska, United States
|
|-
| Win
| align=center| 3–0 
| Devin Turner
| TKO (punches)
| VFC 54
| 
| align=center|2
| align=center|2:25
| Omaha, Nebraska, United States
|
|-
| Win
| align=center| 2–0 
| John Ramirez
| Decision (unanimous)
| VFC 52
| 
| align=center|3
| align=center|5:00
| Omaha, Nebraska, United States
|
|-
| Win
| align=center| 1–0 
| Alvin Mercer
| TKO (punches)
| Shogun Fights 14
| 
| align=center|2
| align=center|0:22
| Baltimore, Maryland, United States
|
|-

References

External links
 
 

1993 births
Living people
Sportspeople from Lagos
Nigerian male mixed martial artists
American male mixed martial artists
Featherweight mixed martial artists
Mixed martial artists utilizing Brazilian jiu-jitsu
Ultimate Fighting Championship male fighters
Naturalized citizens of the United States
American practitioners of Brazilian jiu-jitsu
Nigerian practitioners of Brazilian jiu-jitsu